Lien Chan (born 27 August 1936) is a Taiwanese politician. He was the Chairman of the Taiwan Provincial Government from 1990 to 1993, Premier of the Republic of China from 1993 to 1997, Vice President of the Republic of China from 1996 to 2000, and was the Chairman of the Kuomintang (KMT) from 2000 to 2005, apart from various ministerial posts he had also held. Lien ran for the President of the Republic of China on behalf of the Kuomintang twice in 2000 and 2004, but both lost to Chen Shui-bian of the Democratic Progressive Party. Upon his retirement as KMT Chairman in August 2005, he was given the title Honorary Chairman of KMT. He is highly credited after holding a groundbreaking visit to Mainland China in his capacity as the Chairman of the Kuomintang to meet with the General Secretary of the Chinese Communist Party Hu Jintao on 29 April 2005, the first meeting between the two party leaders after the end of Chinese Civil War in 1949, which subsequently helped thaw the long-stalled cross-strait relations.

Early life and education

Lien Chan was born in Xi'an, Shaanxi province, China as the only child of Taiwanese father Lien Chen-tung and Chinese mother Chao Lan-k'un (趙蘭坤). His paternal grandfather, Lien Heng, was the writer of The General History of Taiwan (臺灣通史), a book that is often cited for the quote, "Taiwan's sorrow is that it has no history." Lien earned a Bachelor's degree in political science from the National Taiwan University in 1957 and a Master of Arts in International Law and Diplomacy in 1961. He received a PhD in political science in 1965 from the University of Chicago and married former Miss Republic of China Fang Yu the same year. Lien is also currently a Trustee Emeritus on the Board of Trustees to the University of Chicago.

Lien held assistant professorships of political science at the University of Wisconsin–Madison from 1966 to 1967 and the University of Connecticut from 1967 to 1968. He returned to Taiwan in 1968 to become visiting professor of political science at the National Taiwan University, serving as chairman of the Political Science Department and dean of the Graduate Institute of Political Science the following year.

Political career 
His official positions included Ambassador to El Salvador (1975–1976), Minister of Transportation and Communications (1981–1987), Vice Premier (1987–1988), Foreign Minister (1988–1990) before becoming Governor of Taiwan Province (1990–1993). In 1993 he was appointed Premier of the Republic of China. In 1996, Lee Teng-hui selected him as running mate in the presidential election. Lee and Lien won the election for the presidency and the vice-presidency respectively. Before becoming Chairman of the KMT, he was Vice Chairman (1993–2000) and a member of the Central Committee (1984–2000).

During his term in office, Lien was credited for having established National Health Insurance, which is the national health insurance policy for all citizens of the Republic of China. It ranks as one of the best national health plans in the world and modeled by other nations who seek to have a national health coverage for other citizens. He spearheaded the constructions of Cross-Island Highway (橫貫公路), a series of highways that connected the eastern side of the island to the western side of the island. Taiwan is dominated by the Central Mountain Range which cordons off the east from the west. In order to go to the eastern side from the western side, one had to circle the island to reach their destinations before the highways were constructed. After Lien constructed these highways, traffic back-and-forth between the east and west of the island was much more efficient. He also began the reconstruction to the Military dependents’ villages (眷村) which were temporary shelters designated for the military personnel and their families when the Kuomintang (KMT) first moved to Taiwan. There are over 879 of these Military dependents’ villages which housing nearly 100,000 households within. Most of this housing was temporary shelter and were constructed during the period between 1945 and 1950s to house the military personnel as the KMT retreated to Taiwan. Half a century later when it became clear that reunification with Mainland China under the terms of the Republic of China would not be possible, it became obvious that the housing for the military personnel would have to be reconstructed.

Throughout Lien's term as Foreign Minister and through his premiership, about 30 countries had diplomatic relations with Republic of China (Taiwan), this was the highest number of diplomatic relations since Republic of China was expelled from the United Nations in 1972 and severed diplomatic relations with the United States in 1976. Lien also established diplomatic relations with Commonwealth of the Bahamas, Grenada, Belize, Republic of Guinea-Bissau and reestablished diplomatic relations with Kingdom of Lesotho, Republic of Liberia and the Republic of Nicaragua.

Lien also established the foundations for the Internet in Taiwan via research centers established under the National Science Council (國家科學委員會). Furthermore, he liberalized the telecommunications network which allowed for multiple players to compete and ushered in the mobile service era in the Telecommunications sector. He also revised and deregulated the regulation on cable television sector that allowed for multiple players in the television and cable sectors. These policies made Taiwan the most liberal area in Asia for Media.

For the purpose of developing Taiwan as an economic hub in the Asia-Pacific, Lien espoused a platform called the “Asia-Pacific Regional Operations Center” because Taiwan has two natural deep water harbors, one is Keelung and second one is Kaohsiung, shipments from all over the world would transport and transfer in these harbors before heading to Japan, Korea, China or Southeast Asia. However, due to Lee Teng-hui's (李登輝) “two state solution” (兩國論), a theory advocated for China and Taiwan to engage in a special "state to state relationship", Mainland China was deeply angered, therefore Taiwan became increasingly marginalized.

Lien took an active role as a representative of Lee Teng-hui in quasi-official diplomacy in the mid-1990s. One of the greatest moments of his career is his 1995 meeting with Václav Havel, in which Lien likened the democratic reforms of the Lee Teng-hui administration as being similar to the Velvet Revolution.

After the defeat of the KMT in 2000, Lien assume the leadership of the KMT. As the Chairman of the KMT, Lien vowed to learn from his loss and remake the KMT party. He held forums to discuss erasing the KMT's image as a corrupt institution and Lien promised to give up property seized by the KMT after the Japanese exodus.

The Pan-Blue reunited in the election of 2004 with Lien and Soong running on a combined ticket against DPP's Chen Shui-bian and Annette Lu. Chen Shui-bian was the incumbent and was trailing 13% behind in the polls before ballot day. Then, out of nowhere came two bullets, one barely grazing Chen's belly and another one grazing Annette Lu's knee. Immediately the DPP-control government suspended all election activities and prohibited all servicemen, policeman and security workers to return home to vote. The servicemen are typically Pan-Blue voters and number of service men affected was roughly 350,000. The DPP Secretary General of the President's office Chiou I-jen (邱義仁) immediately came out on media to announce that there was an assassination attempt on the DPP candidates Chen and Lu and accused the KMT of collaborating with the Chinese Communists Party to assassinate Taiwan's President. Lien lost that election by 0.228% margin, a mere 29,518 votes out of a total of 12,914,422 (12 million nine hundred and fourteen thousand four hundred and twenty two) ballots cast. Both Chen and Lu were released from the hospital on the same day and went to vote on the next day. Neither one had life-threatening injury nor did they lose consciousness or had a surgery. Rather, alleged assassin Chen Yi-hsiung (陳義雄) was killed and his body was found ten days later ditched into a pond near where he lives. His body was formally dressed in suite and tie and entangled in a fishnet.

This incident sparked mass riots and controversy because it was believed that the shooting was staged in order to gain sympathy votes for Chen and Lu who won by a sliver of a margin. Hence the 319 Shooting Truth Investigation Special Committee was established.

On 31 Jan 2008, the 319 Shooting Truth Investigation Special Committee concluded its investigation into the assassination attempt on President Chen Shui-bian (陳水扁) and Vice President Annette Lu (呂秀蓮), and raised questions about whether the shooting was a staged event. "We have compared all of the evidence and clues through interviews and reconstructed the scene. Although the truth of the event remains unclear, the "truth" that government publicized and the evidence don't match," committee convener Wang Ching-feng (王清峰) told reporters. The report also suggested that Chen Yi-hsiung (陳義雄), whom the authorities identified as the shooter, was murdered instead of committing suicide when he was found dead 10 days after the incident.

In 2005, after Ma was elected as KMT chairman to succeed Lien, the KMT Central Committee offered the title of "Chairman Emeritus" (Honorary Chairman) to Lien.

In December 2010, Lien was awarded the Confucius Peace Prize in China, which was instituted as a reaction to the Nobel Peace Prize awarded to Liu Xiaobo. Lien's office said to the Taipei Times: “We've never heard of such an award and of course Mr Lien has no plans to accept it.”

Cross-strait relations

April 2005 breakthrough journey to mainland China

On April 26, 2005, Lien Chan traveled to mainland China to meet with the leaders of the Chinese Communist Party (CCP). His meeting with Communist Party general secretary Hu Jintao was the highest level exchange since Chiang Kai-shek and Mao Zedong met in Chongqing on August 28, 1945, to celebrate the victory in the Second Sino-Japanese War and discuss a possible truce in the impending Chinese Civil War.

On April 27, Lien visited the Sun Yat-sen Mausoleum in Nanjing. On April 28, he arrived in Beijing.

On the afternoon of April 29, he met with PRC Paramount leader Hu Jintao (in his capacity as General Secretary of the Chinese Communist Party).

Before meeting with Hu on April 29, Lien Chan delivered a speech at Peking University, which his 96-year-old mother Chao Lan-k'un attended nearly 80 years ago. On April 30, he headed to his birthplace Xi'an. He revisited Houzaimen Primary School, which he attended 60 years ago. He also visited the Great Mausoleum of Qin Shi Huang, China's first emperor. Early on May 1, he paid homage to his grandmother's tomb near Qingliangsi.

Later that day, Lien arrived in Shanghai, where he attended a banquet hosted by Shanghai CCP Party Secretary General Chen Liangyu. On May 2, he met with Wang Daohan, the 90-year-old chairman of the mainland-based Association for Relations Across the Taiwan Straits, and the representatives of Taiwanese businesspeople. He returned to Taiwan at noon on May 3.

October 2005 visit to Shenyang
In October 2005, Lien made his second visit to the mainland. He visited Shenyang, Liaoning to pay homage to his maternal grandmother's tomb at Lansheng Village and the school where his mother studied.

2006 visit to Mainland China

In April 2006, Lien departed to Mainland China to visit Fujian. He paid tribute to his ancestors in Zhangzhou and received an honorary doctor's degree from Xiamen University in Xiamen.

On 11 April 2006, Lien arrived in Hangzhou, Zhejiang. He was welcomed by Xia Baolong, deputy secretary of Zhejiang Provincial Committee of the Chinese Communist Party at the Hangzhou Xiaoshan International Airport. In Hangzhou, Lien met with provincial government leaders and visited the West Lake.

Two days later, Lien visited Beijing to attend the first Cross-Straits Economic Trade and Culture Forum. Lien met with CCP general secretary Hu Jintao at the forum, where both underscored the peaceful development of relations between the two sides.

2010 visit to Shanghai
In April 2010, Lien visited Shanghai to attend the opening ceremony of the Shanghai World Expo 2010.

2013 visit to Beijing
In February 2013, Lien visited Beijing to meet with Xi Jinping, the newly elected General Secretary of the Chinese Communist Party.

Lien also met with Yu Zhengsheng (chairman-designate of the Chinese People's Political Consultative Conference), Wang Huning (member of the Politburo of the CCP), Li Zhanshu (chief of the General Office of the CCP), Dai Bingguo (state councilor of the PRC), Wang Yi (director of the Taiwan Affairs Office of the State Council), Chen Yunlin and Zheng Lizhong (president and vice president of ARATS).

Lien and his wife Lien Fang Yu also visited Beijing Aerospace Command and Control Center and met with Liu Wang, Liu Yang and Jing Haipeng, astronauts of the Shenzhou 9.

2014 visit to Beijing
Lien and delegates from 80 business leaders and civil group representatives, including former Taiwan Solidarity Union Chairman Shu Chin-chiang, visited Beijing on 17 February to meet with Zhang Zhijun, the head of Taiwan Affairs Office, and on 18 February with Xi Jinping, General Secretary of the Chinese Communist Party CCP Central Committee, at the Diaoyutai State Guesthouse for non-governmental exchanges. This 3-day trip came after the invitation from the Chinese Communist Party.

2015 visit to Beijing
Lien was invited to a Chinese military parade marking the end of the Second Sino–Japanese War in September 2015. During the visit, Lien asked Beijing to strongly consider supporting ROC President Ma Ying-jeou's East China Sea Peace Initiative.

APEC representative 

Lien was selected by President Ma Ying-jeou as special envoy  to represent the Republic of China (participating as Chinese Taipei) at the Asia-Pacific Economic Cooperation (APEC) in 2008–2012.

While at APEC, Lien also met with Chinese Communist Party general secretary Hu Jintao, the highest level of official exchange between the Mainland and Taiwan on the international stage at that time.

Name 
His family name is Lien; his given name is Chan. "Chan" means "battles" and his full name literally means "successive battles." The name originated from Lien Heng who wrote to his pregnant daughter-in-law in Xi'an:

Family 
Lien Chan was descended from a family of literati. His family arrived in Taiwan during the Emperor Kang Xi era and had settled in Tainan residing in an area called Ma Bing Ying; which was the former training ground of the Zheng Cheng Gung forces in his campaign against the Dutch. Lien's family harvested sugar on their plantations for generations. Lien's grandmother's family were also wealthy merchants who traded camphor and sugar. Lien ‘s mother, Chao Lan Kun came from a wealthy Shenyang family, and is credited for having preserve the family wealth throughout the turbulent times of post-Japanese colonization.

Lien is married to Lien Fang Yu. They have two sons, Sean Lien and Lien Sheng-Wu (連勝武), and two daughters, Lien Hui-Hsin (連惠心) and Lien Yong-Hsin (連詠心).

See also 

 Kuomintang
 Politics of the Republic of China
 Elections in the Republic of China
 History of the Republic of China
 Administrative divisions of the Republic of China
 Political status of Taiwan

References

External links 

 Official Kuomintang website

|-

|-

|-

|-

|-

|-

|-

|-

1936 births
Affiliated Senior High School of National Taiwan Normal University alumni
Chairpersons of the Kuomintang
Chairpersons of the Taiwan Provincial Government
Cheng Kung Senior High School alumni
Chinese Civil War refugees
Kuomintang presidential nominees
Lien Heng family
Living people
National Taiwan University alumni
Politicians from Xi'an
Premiers of the Republic of China on Taiwan
Republic of China politicians from Shaanxi
Taiwanese Ministers of Foreign Affairs
Taiwanese Ministers of Transportation and Communications
Taiwanese people from Shaanxi
University of Chicago alumni
Vice presidents of the Republic of China on Taiwan
Recipients of the Order of Chiang Chung-Cheng